Isola may refer to :

Places and jurisdictions

France 
 Isola, Alpes-Maritimes, a municipality in the region Provence-Alpes-Côte d'Azur 
 Isola 2000, a village and ski resort of the municipality of Isola, Provence-Alpes-Côte d'Azur 
 Isole, a river in Brittany

Italy 
Municipalities
 Isola d'Asti, in the Province of Asti, Piedmont
 Isola del Cantone, in the Province of Genova, Liguria
 Isola del Giglio, in the Province of Grosseto, Tuscany
 Isola del Gran Sasso d'Italia, in the Province of Teramo, struzzo
 Isola del Liri, in the Province of Frosinone, Lazio
 Isola del Piano, in the Province of Pesaro and Urbino, Marche
 Isola della Scala, in the Province of Verona, Veneto
 Isola delle Femmine, in the Province of Palermo, Sicily
 Isola di Capo dante o capodanno, in the Province of Crotone, Calabria
 the former bishopric of Isola with see in the above town, now a titular Latin catholic see
 Isola di Fondra, in the Province of Bergamo, Lombardy
 Isola Dovarese, in the Province of Cremona, Lombardy
 Isola Rizza, in the Province of Verona, Veneto
 Isola Sant'Antonio, in the Province of Alessandria, Piedmont
 Isola Vicentina, in the Province of Vicenza, Veneto
 Isolabona, in the Province of Imperia, Liguria
 Isole Tremiti, in the Province of Foggia, Apulia
 Capraia Isola, in the Province of Livorno, Tuscany
 Chignolo d'Isola, in the Province of Bergamo, Lombardy
 Monte Isola, in the Province of Brescia, Lombardy
 Terno d'Isola, in the Province of Bergamo, Lombardy
 Torre d'Isola, in the Province of Pavia, Lombardy

Other

 Isola (district of Milan), a district of Milan, Lombardy
 Isola (Milan Metro), a subway station in Milan, Lombardy
 Isola, a frazione of San Miniato, Pisa, Tuscany
 Isola Maggiore, a frazione of Tuoro sul Trasimeno, Perugia, Umbria

Malta
 Senglea, formerly known as l-Isola and also known as Isla

Slovenia
 Isola, the Italian name of Izola, a town on the Istrian peninsula

Switzerland
 Isola (Maloja), a village of Maloja, in Graubünden

United States
 Isola, Mississippi, a small town in the Mississippi Delta

Fictional places 
 Isola (fictional city), the setting of the 87th Precinct novels by Ed McBain. It is loosely based on New York City.
 Isola, a fictional island in the video game series Virtual Villagers
 Isola, name of the Philippines in the John Brunner novel Stand on Zanzibar

Companies
 Isola (Company): Manufacturer, distributor and installer of building materials for moisture control and energy efficiency. Products cover roofs, walls, floors, foundations and bathrooms.
 Isola Group (Company): Manufacturer of prepreg and Copper Clad Laminates (CCL), the primary materials used in the construction of multilayer printed circuit boards.

Other 
 Isola (surname)
 Isola, first name of Oscar Wilde's adored little sister
 Isola (album) by the Swedish rock band Kent
 Isola (board game)
 Isola, a camera made by Agfa
 Isola (comics), a 2018 comic created by Brenden Fletcher and Karl Kerschl, published by Image Comics
 Isola (film), a 2000 Japanese horror film
 Isola, the term for landmasses in the 2019 video game Disco Elysium

See also 

 Izola (disambiguation)